Glyconic (from Glycon, a Greek lyric poet) is a form of meter in classical Greek and Latin poetry. The glyconic line is the most basic form of Aeolic verse, and it is often combined with others.

The basic shape (often abbreviated as gl) is as follows:
 x x   – u u –   u –
Here "x" indicates an anceps, "–" a longum, and "u" a brevis. "x x" is known as the Aeolic base, which can be a spondeus "– –", a trochee "– u", or an iamb "u –". The middle foot "– u u –" is a choriambus, as a so-called choriambic nucleus is a defining element of Aeolic verse. As in all classical verse forms, the phenomenon of brevis in longo is observed, so although the last syllable can actually be short or long, it always "counts" as long.

The acephalous ("headless") version (^gl), also known as the telesillean (Latin: telesilleus), is:
   x   – u u –   u –

Runs of glyconic lines are often ended by a pherecratean (a glyconic without the last brevis: x x – u u – –), as in the glyconic and pherecratean stanzas found in Anacreon and Catullus (i.e. Catullus 34 and 61). The combination of glyconic and pherecratean is given the name priapean (Latin: priapeus):
 x x – u u – u – | x x – u u – –

References
Daniel H. Garrison (editor). The Student's Catullus. University of Oklahoma Press: Norman, 2004.

Further reading
M. L. West.  Greek Metre.  Oxford University Press, 1982.

Types of verses